John Fletcher Tweeddale (December 18, 1855 – December 30, 1948) was a Canadian politician. He served in the Legislative Assembly of New Brunswick from 1903 to 1912 and 1917 to 1920 as member of the Liberal party. He died in 1948, aged 93.

References 

1855 births
1948 deaths
New Brunswick Liberal Association MLAs